The Independent Commission Against Corruption (ICAC) is the Anti-corruption agency of Mauritius. The ICAC is headed by the Director-General.

History and establishment 
ICAC was established under the Prevention of Corruption Act 2002 (PoCA). It was created to replace the defunct Economic Crime Office (ECO) which was dismantled by the MSM-MMM government in December 2001. ICAC has 3 main functions; 
 Investigation: enforcement of the laws against corruption. 
 Prevention: elimination of opportunities for corruption from systems and procedures. 
 Education: prevention of corruption through public education and support.

ICAC strategic objectives are to; 
 Implement obligations in the SADC Protocol and the UN Convention against corruption as far as they relate to prevention by adapting corruption prevention strategies to suit the Mauritian environment; 
 Promote integrity, accountability, sound management of public affairs and responsible behaviour at organisational and individual levels and prompt corruption prevention cultures in the public sector; 
 Maintain a high public profile and "mind share" within the community by enhancing public confidence and trust in the public sector; and 
 Promote and strengthen the development of mechanisms to prevent and detect corruption in public and private sector.

Controversies 
In 2015, an arrest warrant issued for the director of public prosecutions sparked a debate about the impartiality of the government's anti-corruption campaign. A board member of the ICAC, handed in her resignation, claiming that the institution was in the process of going against the country's democratic principles, apparently implying that the commission was not acting independently.  In 2006, ICAC initiated an investigation to dismantle a network of University of Mauritius lecturers moonlighting in other universities.

See also 
 Corruption in Mauritius
 Politics of Mauritius

References

External links

 ICAC Annual report - 2011

Law enforcement agencies of Mauritius
Government agencies of Mauritius
2002 establishments in Mauritius
Government agencies established in 2002
Anti-corruption agencies